The Wirral Independent Network (or WIN) was a short-lived minor political party that contested the 2003, 2004 and 2006 local elections in Wirral.

The party was founded by ex-Labour members disillusioned with the council administration. After its dissolution, several members went on to join the Green Party and, later, rejoined Labour.

Elected representatives

WIN had one councillor after Colin Dow, who previously sat as an Independent after having the Labour whip removed in December 2001, created the network before the 2003 election. He failed to win re-election.

Electoral performance

Wirral local elections

References

Locally based political parties in England
Politics of the Metropolitan Borough of Wirral
Local government in the Metropolitan Borough of Wirral
Defunct political parties in the United Kingdom